An election to Essex County Council took place on 1 May 1997 as part of the 1997 United Kingdom local elections. 79 councillors were elected from various electoral divisions, which returned either one or two county councillors each by first-past-the-post voting for a four-year term of office. With the creation of Southend-on-Sea Borough Council and Thurrock Council in 1998 the number of seats contested at this election was reduced by 19. In 1993 the breakdown of these seats were, Lab 9 Con 5 LD 5.

Summary

Previous composition

1993 election

Composition of council seats before election

Results

|-bgcolor=#F6F6F6
| colspan=2 style="text-align: right; margin-right: 1em" | Total
| style="text-align: right;" | 79
| colspan=5 |
| style="text-align: right;" | 723,320
| style="text-align: right;" | 
|-
|}

Election of Group Leaders

Paul White (Stock) was elected leader of the Conservative Group, Mervyn Juliff (Great Parndon) was elected leader of the Labour Group and Kenneth Jones (Park) was elected leader of the Liberal Democratic Group.

Government Formation
Despite winning less than half the seats contested, the incumbent Labour-Liberal Democrat coalition continued in government because the members from Southend and Thurrock (whose seats had not been contested at the election) gave them a 52 to 45 majority over the Conservatives until April 1998 when those seats would be abolished. 

After council leader Chris Pearson (Tendring Rural West), wasn't reelected in Maypole, Mervyn Juliff (Great Parndon) became council leader until the departure of the 19 Southend and Thurrock councilors, at which point Conservative group leader Paul White became leader. 

However in May 1999 Alison Enkel (Brentwood Rural) resigned from the Conservatives. This following a by election loss to Labour a year before gave control of the council back to the Labour-Liberal Democrat coalition. 

This proved unworkable as with further resignations leading to a power struggle before defeat in budget vote which caused the coalition to resign and the Conservatives to return.

Results by Electoral Divisions

Basildon

District Summary

Division Results

Braintree

District Summary

Division Results

Brentwood

District Summary

Division Results

Castle Point

District Summary

Division Results

Chelmsford

District Summary

Division Results

Colchester

District Summary

Division Results

No Green candidate as previous (−2.8).

No Green candidate as previous (−2.6).

No Liberal Democrat candidate as previous (−25.2).

No Green candidate as previous (−3.7).

Epping Forest

District Summary

Division Results

Harlow

District Summary

Division Results

Maldon

District Summary

Division Results

Rochford

District Summary

Division Results

Tendring

District Summary

Division Results

Uttlesford

District Summary

Division Results

By-elections

Southend

References

Essex County Council elections
1997 English local elections
1990s in Essex